KTBY, virtual channel 4 (UHF digital channel 20), is a Fox-affiliated television station licensed to Anchorage, Alaska, United States. The station is owned by Cumming, Georgia-based Coastal Television Broadcasting Company LLC, which also operates ABC/CW+ affiliate KYUR (channel 13) under joint sales and shared services agreements (JSA/SSA) with owner Vision Alaska LLC. The two stations share studios on East Tudor Road in Anchorage; KTBY's transmitter is located in historic downtown Anchorage atop the Hilton Anchorage East Tower hotel.

Some of KTBY's programming is broadcast to rural communities via low-power translators through the Alaska Rural Communications Service (ARCS).

History
KTBY signed on the air on December 2, 1983 as a locally owned independent with Mike Parker as President, Mike Buck as General Manager and Dave Peters II as Program Director before joining the new Fox network on its launch of October 9, 1986 (being part of a small number of TV stations on the VHF dial not owned by the network to be affiliated with Fox upon its startup), an affiliation which continues today. It was the only Fox station in Alaska until 1992, when KFXF in Fairbanks went on the air; in the late 1980s, it also became the first station in Alaska to broadcast 24 hours a day.

During the 1980s, KTBY was the first Anchorage station to air professional wrestling with any regularity, largely in response to the increase in mainstream interest. Televised wrestling programs were largely absent from Anchorage television, as the programs were traditionally used to promote live events, which have been held only occasionally in Alaska dating back to the 1950s. The station originally aired AWA All-Star Wrestling (in conjunction with a short-lived attempt on their part to promote events in the market), and later World Class Championship Wrestling and WWF Superstars of Wrestling.

In June 2010, Coastal Television hired Scott Centers as General Manager to manage KTBY and under a shared services agreement, manage Vision Alaska I and Vision Alaska II. In September 2010, KTBY relocated its master control operations to colocate with Vision Alaska I.

News operation
Until October 1, 2008, KTBY aired a 9:00 p.m. weeknight newscast produced by local CBS affiliate KTVA (channel 11). This production ceased when KTBY began its own news operation.

In April 2020, as a result of impending economic concerns caused by the COVID-19 pandemic, KTBY and KYUR announced plans to outsource its news production to the national NewsNet service, which began operations one year earlier. All of the stations' newscasts outside of prime time, including Good Day Alaska, were canceled, and the majority of the local staff were laid off. By the end of the month, KYUR's news output had been reduced to a 30-minute newscast at 10 p.m. and KTBY was reduced to an hour-long newscast at 9 p.m. Both of these newscasts are branded as NewsNet Alaska, featuring a brief local news segment produced in Anchorage, with the rest of the broadcast utilizing the NewsNet national feed produced out of Cadillac, Michigan. Despite the reduction in local news, KTBY and KYUR have opted to use the NewsNet national branding "More News. More Often." in their broadcasts.

Technical information

Subchannels
The station's digital signal is multiplexed:

Analog-to-digital conversion
KTBY shut down its analog signal, over VHF channel 4, on June 12, 2009, the official date in which full-power television stations in the United States transitioned from analog to digital broadcasts under federal mandate. The station's digital signal remained on its pre-transition UHF channel 20. Through the use of PSIP, digital television receivers display the station's virtual channel as its former VHF analog channel 4.

References

External links
 

1983 establishments in Alaska
Fox network affiliates
Dabl affiliates
Cozi TV affiliates
Defy TV affiliates
TrueReal affiliates
Television channels and stations established in 1983
TBY